Friðjón Skarphéðinsson (15 April 1909 – 31 March 1996) was an Icelandic politician and former minister for social affairs from December 1958 to November 1959. He served as speaker of the Althing from 1959 to 1963.

References

External links 
 Non auto-biography of Friðjón Skarphéðinsson on the parliament website

1909 births
1996 deaths
Fridjon Skarphedinsson
Fridjon Skarphedinsson
Fridjon Skarphedinsson